Merchants of Light is the second live offering by Big Big Train and is based on the autumn 2017 Concerts at Cadogan Hall, London. It was recorded across three dates 29, 30 September and 1 October 2017, then first released on 27 July 2018.

The setlist is made up of 16 tracks and these are drawn from the latest four albums of the band, The Underfall Yard, English Electric, Folklore and Grimspound. The release of the 2 CD album was preceded by a single of the track "Swan Hunter" a few days before the full live album.

Reaction
The three scheduled shows again sold out. 
The review rather effusively states that the shows and recording is

Track listing
Disc one

Disc two

Musicians
 David Longdon - Vocals, Flute, Percussion
 Greg Spawton - Bass Guitar 
 Nick D’Virgilio - Drums, Percussion, Vocals
 Danny Manners - Keyboards
 Andy Poole - Keyboards, Guitar
 Dave Gregory - Guitar
 Rikard Sjöblom - Guitar, Keyboards, Vocals
 Rachel Hall - Violin, Vocals

with
 Dave Desmond - Trombone
 Ben Godfrey - Trumpet
 Nick Stones - French Horn
 John Storey - Euphonium
 Jon Truscott - Tuba

References

External links
 
 

2018 live albums
Big Big Train albums